Frances White (born Frances Mae Caples; January 1, 1896 – February 24, 1969) was an American singer and actress on Broadway, on the vaudeville stage, and in silent film. She popularized the spelling song "M-I-S-S-I-S-S-I-P-P-I". She played "Fanny Warden" in The New Adventures of J. Rufus Wallingford (1915), a series of silent short comedies. She was also in the cast of the eugenics film The Black Stork (1917).

Early life 
Frances Caples was the daughter of Edward T. Caples and Caroline Leibfried Caples. Her grandfather was a wealthy Texas banker. She may have been from Texas, San Francisco, Los Angeles, or Seattle (sources vary on this point).

Career 

White began her stage career in Los Angeles in 1910. She joined William Rock; the duo Rock & White found success on the vaudeville circuit with a musical comedy and dance act before they split in 1919. She was a "child impersonator", wearing gingham rompers and an oversized hair bow; in this guise, she was known for popularizing the spelling song "M-I-S-S-I-S-S-I-P-P-I". She was also known for a very short "neat and smart" haircut, brushed back to the nape with oil. 

White played "Fanny Warden" in The New Adventures of J. Rufus Wallingford (1915), a series of silent short films starring Burr McIntosh and Max Figman. She was also in the cast of the eugenics film The Black Stork (1917). Her Broadway credits included roles in Ziegfeld Follies of 1916, Hitchy-Koo (1917), Let's Go (1918), Ziegfeld Midnight Frolic (1919), Jimmie (1921), and The Hotel Mouse (1922). 

White's last film role was in Face to Face (1922), with Marguerite Marsh. "This unique actress knows her limitations and flatly refuses to be anything but her breezy, slangy, fresh young self," said a 1925 newspaper profile. Also in 1925, she explained to Lorena Hickok that the distinctive sound of her voice was the result of a tonsillectomy.

Legal problems 
In 1922, Frances White was sued for alienation of affections by Dorothy Wolfe Stothart, the wife of composer Herbert Stothart.  A Seattle jeweler sued White for money owed in the late 1920s. In 1930, she was briefly jailed for failure to pay a taxi fare in New York City. In 1931, she declared bankruptcy.

Personal life 
White first married in 1910, at age 14, in Mexico, to her co-star Lonnie Garwood; the marriage was quickly annulled. She next married comedian Frank Fay in 1917; they soon divorced. She married again, to businessman Clinton Donnelly in 1923; they too divorced. She lived with her mother in New York City and Los Angeles, until her mother's death in 1955. White died in 1969, aged 73 years, in Los Angeles.

References

External links 
 A recording of Frances White singing "Go-Zin-To", a novelty song, on YouTube
 A recording of Frances White singing "I'd Like to be a Monkey in the Zoo", a novelty song, on YouTube
 An autographed photograph of Frances White, in the University of Washington Libraries, Special Collections
 
 
 

1896 births
1969 deaths
Actresses from Seattle
American stage actresses
American film actresses
American silent film actresses
American women comedians
American women singers
Vaudeville performers